Daniel Katz may refer to:

 Daniel Katz (psychologist) (1903–1998), American psychologist
 Daniel Katz (environmental activist) (born 1962), American environmentalist writer, speaker and activist
 Daniel Katz (politician) (born 1961), Argentine politician
 Daniel Katz (writer) (born 1938), Jewish-Finnish writer